Léna Carrau (born July 4, 1997) is a French female acrobatic gymnast. With partners Laura Viaud and Agathe Meunier, Carrau competed in the 2014 Acrobatic Gymnastics World Championships.

References

1997 births
Living people
French acrobatic gymnasts
Female acrobatic gymnasts
21st-century French women